Inaya Ezzeddine is a Lebanese politician and doctor who serves as member of parliament since 2018. A member of Amal Movement, she has served as minister of state for administrative reform in the second cabinet of Saad Hariri from 2016 to 2019. She chairs the women and children parliamentary committee. In 2020, French President Emmanuel Macron awarded her the Legion of Honor.

See also 

 Paula Yacoubian
Nabih Berri

References 

Lebanese politicians
Amal Movement politicians
Living people
21st-century Lebanese women politicians
21st-century Lebanese politicians
Recipients of the Legion of Honour
20th-century Lebanese physicians
Year of birth missing (living people)